The JAXA Astronaut Corps is a unit of the Japan Aerospace Exploration Agency (JAXA)  that selects, trains, and provides astronauts as crew members for U.S. and Russian space missions. The corps has six active members, able to serve on the International Space Station (ISS).

History
The first Japanese astronauts were chosen by NASDA, the predecessor to JAXA, in 1985 to train as international mission specialists in the Space Shuttle program.

The first Japanese citizen to fly in space was Toyohiro Akiyama, a journalist sponsored by TBS, who flew on the Soviet Soyuz TM-11 in December 1990. He spent more than seven days in space on the Mir space station, in what the Soviets called their first commercial spaceflight which allowed them to earn $14 million.

The first member of the Japanese Astronaut Corps to fly was Mamoru Mohri aboard STS-47 in 1992.

On 1 October 2003, three organizations were merged to form the new JAXA: Japan's Institute of Space and Astronautical Science (ISAS), the National Aerospace Laboratory of Japan (NAL), and National Space Development Agency of Japan (NASDA). JAXA was formed as an Independent Administrative Institution administered by the Ministry of Education, Culture, Sports, Science and Technology (MEXT) and the Ministry of Internal Affairs and Communications (MIC).

Organization
The Astronauts Corps is one of the main divisions within JAXA. There are seven active astronauts in the corps and four former astronauts, all of whom have gone into space. Astronaut Kimiya Yui serves as the head of the corps.

Qualifications
JAXA generally recruits astronauts who have degrees as scientists, engineers and/or medical doctors. In addition to being Japanese citizens or residents, candidates must meet certain physical standards (including height, weight, hearing and visual acuity), educational requirements, and be fluent in English.

Members

Active astronauts
JAXA has seven active astronauts who have all flown to the International Space Station.

Former astronauts
There are five former JAXA astronauts.

Selection groups
1985 NASDA Group
1992 NASDA Group
1996 NASDA Group
1999 NASDA Group
2009 JAXA Group

See also
Toyohiro Akiyama   First Japanese person in space
Canadian Astronaut Corps
European Astronaut Corps
NASA Astronaut Corps
List of astronauts by selection
Human spaceflight
History of spaceflight

References

External links
JAXA Astronaut Corps

Lists of astronauts